Begal is a village and union council in the Chakwal District of Punjab, Pakistan. It is part of the Chakwal Tehsil, and is located at 33°2'57N 72°39'11E.

References

Union councils of Chakwal District
Populated places in Chakwal District